Robert Walls (born 1950) is an Australian rules footballer.

Robert Walls may also refer to:

 Robert Walls (politician) (1884–1953), New Zealand politician
 Robert Walls (admiral) (born 1941), officer of the Royal Australian Navy
 Robert E. Walls (born 1941), American politician in the Delaware House of Representatives
 Bob Walls (1927–1999), New Zealand painter